Ri Yong-jin (born 26 January 1971) is a North Korean former footballer. He represented North Korea on at least fourteen occasions between 1989 and 1993, scoring once.

Career statistics

International

International goals
Scores and results list North Korea's goal tally first, score column indicates score after each North Korea goal.

References

1971 births
Living people
North Korean footballers
North Korea international footballers
Association football midfielders